Mehwar TV Channel is an Egyptian TV channel based in Giza, Egypt. It covers current events, as well as broadcasting content concerning political and religious topics, and some entertainment programmes. The channel has a particular focus on Egyptian topics. Its main owner and chairman is Hassan Rateb. The channel is part of Sama Group International Co.

References

External links

Arabic-language television stations
Television stations in Egypt
Mass media in Giza